Saint-Romain-le-Puy is a commune in the Loire department in central France.

It was originally built on the volcanic peak (le puy), but has since migrated to the plain.

Geography
Le Puy itself is of volcanic origin and the surrounding plain of Forez has basaltic conglomerates.  Wells have been sunk to exploit the naturally sparkling mineral waters.

History
Le Puy is located on the Roman road, the Bolène Way, linking Lyon (Lugdunum) to Bordeaux (Burdigala), which was constructed during the reign of the emperor Augustus, by his son-in-law Agrippa.  It is also on the Gallo-Roman way from Sury to Changy.  These roads were later reused by pilgrims to Santiago de Compostela.

About 500, Carétène (aunt of Saint Clotilde the wife of Clovis) replaced a temple of Venus (famous for a bath of youth utilising the areas' mineral springs) by a Christian church dedicated to Saint Michael.

Guy II de Forez, the feudal lord of Saint-Romain-le-Puy, was the vassal of Louis VII. In 1173, the fief of Saint-Romain was transferred from Ainay Abbey to the County of Lyon.

In 1218, Count Guy IV de Forez, gave the priory (founded in 1007) into the care of the religious of Saint-Thomas-les-Nonnains.

There was longstanding conflict between the chateau and the priory.

In 1431, the town was pillaged by routiers under Rodrigo de Villandrando on orders from the Crown as part of the quashing of a jacquerie.

In 1531, Forez passed from the control of the Dukes of Bourbon to the Crown of France.

In 1633, the surrounding town wall was destroyed by order of Richelieu.

During World War I, the town lost 102 soldiers.

Population

Economy
Local industries include Mineral Waters (François Parot, a public works entrepreneur sunk a well in 1858) and Glassmaking (Saint-Gobain-Emballage factory founded in 1893).  Agriculture includes beef rearing, dairying and wine-growing.

Sights
 Priory of Saint-Romain-le-Puy 10th century to 14th century. Fortified priory on a hill, founded by Ainay Abbey. Historic Monument;
 Château de La Bruyère and its outbuildings are late 18th century - early 19th century.  The current castle was started in 1792 by Damian Battant de Pomerol, a lawyer in Montbrison, and was completed about 1803.  Quid mentions that a castle in the town was referred to in the 12th century.  Historic Monument - protected elements include the pigeon loft, roofing, salon and interior décor.  There is also a fine park. Ref: E. Salomon, Les châteaux historiques de Forez, In-4, 1926, t. I, p66-70;

International relations
The commune is twinned with Monte San Biagio (Italy).

See also
Communes of the Loire department

References

External links
All sites in French, unless otherwise indicated.
 Site of the Mayor's Office
 Photographs of the Priory
 History of Forez
 A visit the Parot mineral water factory
 Saint-Romain-le-Puy on the Institut Géographique National site
  Financial Data  for Saint-Romain-le-Puy from the Ministry of the Economy, Finances and Industry
 Belltower of Parish Church
 Saint-Romain-le-Puy on the Cassini map

Communes of Loire (department)
Segusiavi